Rina Winifred Moore (née Ropiha, 6 April 1923 – 28 November 1975) was a New Zealand medical doctor. She was the first female Māori doctor.

Early life 
Rina Winifred Ropiha was born in Auckland, New Zealand, on 6 April 1923. Her mother was Rhoda Walker (Te Whānau-ā-Apanui) and her father Tipi Tainui Ropiha (Ngāti Kahungunu, Rangitāne). Her father was the first Māori to be Secretary of Maori Affairs. She entered medical school at the University of Otago in 1943, marrying Ian Moore in 1944 and giving birth to their first child in 1945. She was able to continue her studies with family support and graduated in 1948.

Career 
In 1948 Moore began work as an assistant medical officer in Nelson at Ngāwhatu, a psychiatric hospital where she later spent some years as Medical Officer. She took a particular interest in mental health, attempting to break down prejudice about mental illness and strengthen links between hospital care and the community. She was also an advocate for sex education. In the 1960s she set up a Family Advisory Clinic, a private psychiatric and counselling clinic, in her own home.

She also spoke widely on Māori health and mental health presenting a paper to the South Island Conference of Young Māori Leaders held in Christchurch, 19–21 August 1960. In 1972 she wrote four papers for the International Congress on Social Psychiatry in Israel covering urban migration, problems facing Māori and minority races, health and mental health.

She died in Nelson in 1975.

Recognition 
In 2017, Moore selected as one of the Royal Society Te Apārangi's "150 women in 150 words", celebrating the contributions of women to knowledge in New Zealand.

References

External links 
 Ngawhatu Nelson Photo News. No. 12. 14 October 1961. Includes a photo of Dr R.W. Moore admitting a patient.

1923 births
1975 deaths
New Zealand women medical doctors
20th-century New Zealand medical doctors
Ngāti Kahungunu people
Rangitāne people
Te Whānau-ā-Apanui people
New Zealand Māori medical doctors
People from Auckland
20th-century women physicians
Māori and Pacific Island scientists